= Wren Collective =

American criminal justice reform group

The Wren Collective is an American criminal justice reform group based in Texas.

In 2025, Hennepin County, Minnesota Attorney Mary Moriarty hired the collective for $150,000 to fight "misinformation" that year.

The general manager and founder is Jessica Brand. The operations director is Rebecca Silber.
